Bassac may refer to:
 BASSAC, the British Association of Settlements and Social Action Centres, a membership body for British community organisations, including members of the settlement movement
 Bassac, Charente, a commune in the Charente department of France
 Beauregard-et-Bassac, Dordogne, France
 Bassac River, a distributary of the Tonle Sap and Mekong River
 An alternative spelling of Champasak (disambiguation), various places in Laos
 Bassac Theater a Cambodian theater genre